Hoseynabad-e Fazeli (also Romanized as Ḩoseynābād-e Faz̤elī; also known as Ḩoseynābād) is a village in Sharifabad Rural District, in the Central District of Sirjan County, Kerman Province, Iran. At the 2006 census, its population was 23, in five families.

References 

Populated places in Sirjan County